Nazran Airport is a civil airport located near Nazran, Russia.

See also 
 Magas Airport

Airports built in the Soviet Union
Airports in the Republic of Ingushetia